Edgar Nakladal (born 6 July 1961) was a professional sprinter representing West Germany. At the inaugural IAAF World Championships in Athletics in 1983, he won the silver medal in the 4x400m by virtue of running for his team in the preliminary rounds. Though he didn't run in the final at Worlds, he did run in the final and win the 4x400m at the 1982 European Championships in Athletics and the 1979 European Junior Championships in Athletics.

His personal best in the 400m was 45.97 seconds, which he set in Bremen, Germany on June 24, 1983. At the 1983 Worlds, he became one of the first athletes ever to be substituted out of a final and still receive a medal.

Major international competitions

References 

Living people
1961 births
West German male sprinters